Political philology is "an active mode of understanding" texts. It does not simply take (religious) texts at face-value as religious texts without any connection to a social and political context, but situates them in a historical context, and is sensitive to the social and political implications and usages of a (religious) text.

See also
 Hermeneutics of suspicion
 Sheldon Pollock
 The Battle for Sanskrit

References

Sources

External links
 Sheldon Pollock:Liberation Philology
 Thomas Crowley, Can Language Save Us All?

Hermeneutics